Sasha and Emma: The Anarchist Odyssey of Alexander Berkman and Emma Goldman is a 2012 history book about Alexander Berkman and Emma Goldman. The book was co-authored by the father-daughter pair Paul and Karen Avrich, and posthumously published after Paul's death. It was a New York Times Book Review Editors' Choice for 2012.

References

Sources

External links 

 
 

1980 non-fiction books
American biographies
Biographies of Emma Goldman
Books by Paul Avrich
Belknap Press books
History books about anarchism
History books about Russia
History books about the United States